Helochares is a genus of water scavenger beetles in the family Hydrophilidae, represented by 161 described species. It is distributed across the Afrotropical, Australasian, Indo-Malayan, Nearctic, and Palearctic realms.

Taxonomy 
Helochares is one of the largest and most taxonomically problematic genera within the Acidocerinae. It was originally described by Étienne Mulsant in 1844. 

For a long time Helochares contained five subgenera: Batochares (currently recognized as a separate genus ), Helochares, Helocharimorphus (now synonymized under Helochares ), Hydrobaticus (now synonymized under Helochares ), and Sindolus (currently regognized as a separate genus ).

Several taxa that used to be recognized as typical Helochares are now assigned to newly created genera (e.g., Colossochares, Novochares) or re-assigned to exinsting genera (i.e., Peltochares), based on a phylogenetic analysis based on molecular data.

Description 
As currently defined, Helochares contains small to medium-sized beetles (2–7 mm), which are yellowish to brown in coloration. There is a lot of variation in the impression of the elytral punctation, and the aedeagal forms are also highly variable (see Figure 37 in Girón and Short 2021). A detailed diagnosis can be found in Girón and Short 2021.

Species

References

Hydrophilidae genera